The Govt. Boys Sr. Sec. School No-1, Shakti Nagar, commonly known as Shakti Nagar School No. 1, was established in 1957. The founding principal of the school was Dr. Suraj Narain Sharma.

The Delhi government had established several secondary schools before 1957, but there was no senior secondary school. Four new senior secondary schools, including GBSS (Government Boys' Senior Secondary) School number 1, were only established on May 1 of that year.

The school is affiliated to the Central Board of Secondary Education.

Location and campus
GBSS School No-1 is situated in Shakti Nagar in north Delhi, 1 km from the main campus or north campus of the University of Delhi. It has a large green area and playground, two auditoriums with a capacity of more than 400 people each, a modern library with a collection of more than 18,000 books including an e-books facility. The school has laboratories for sciences, social sciences, and mathematics. Classes take place in two shifts; the morning shift (for girls only) runs from 7am to 12:30pm and the afternoon shift is from 1pm to 6:30pm. The girls' school, Sarvodaya Kanya Vidyalaya (S.K.V) is for girls from first to twelfth class, and the boys' school for boys from sixth to twelfth class.

Awards

The school has won many zonal, state and national awards in sports and education.
 
1) In 2002 the school won the Indira Award 2002-2003 for the best Government School in Delhi.

2) In 2009 it was awarded the Indira Award 2009-2010 for district's best school by the Directorate of Education.

School magazine
The Shakti Saurbham annual school magazine covers events organized by the school, photographs of meritorious students and also features students' articles, poems, and jokes. It is published in Hindi, English and Sanskrit.

Shakti Nagar Old Boys' Association 
The association is involved in students' welfare activities.

NCC & Scout

The school also have an active group of NCC and Scouts and guides students. they participated in different activities around the year and also attend annual and combined annual training camps organised by the authorities.

Annual day

The school celebrates its annual day in February, with different cultural programmes and prize distribution to meritorious students. This year the event is followed by 'Saraswati Vandana' and the release of its annual magazine Shakti Saurbham.

References

External links
  Directorate of education
  Schools in North Delhi

High schools and secondary schools in Delhi
Boys' schools in India